Shiren the Wanderer 2: Oni Invasion! Shiren Castle! is a 2000 role-playing video game developed by Chunsoft and published by Nintendo for the Nintendo 64. It is the second main entry in the Shiren the Wanderer series, itself part of the larger Mystery Dungeon series, and was released in Japan on September 27. The game follows Shiren, a boy who aims to defend a village from attacking demons by building a castle; he finds building materials and other items by exploring dungeons.

Shiren the Wanderer 2 was the first in the series to use 3D graphics, which was done as a way to evolve the series; the development team focused on creating original features, and used the 3D engine to enable free roaming through open environments. It was originally planned for release on the 64DD, but development was later moved to the regular Nintendo 64 instead.

Gameplay
Shiren the Wanderer 2 is a role-playing game in which players aim to build a castle. To do this, the player needs to find stone, iron, water, earth and wood to use as building materials. After constructing a castle, the player needs to defend it from attacking demons and defeat the demons' leader. The building materials are found within various dungeons that are spread out across the game's open world; more difficult dungeons house higher quality materials, which stand better against the demons and are less likely to break.

There are two types of dungeons: "shuffle dungeons", which consist of irregularly shaped areas, and "random dungeons", which consist of square areas connected through long hallways. Each time the player enters a dungeon, its layout and the locations of items and monsters within it change. The dungeons include traps, which the player can uncover by using their sword. The game is turn-based, with enemies taking one turn every time the player performs an action, such as walking one step or attacking. In order to damage an enemy, the player needs to be close to them; the player can move diagonally to get closer to the enemy in fewer turns.

The player can use various types of weapons in battle; they start out with just a katana, but find weapons such as broadswords and sickles throughout the game. The player also finds various items while exploring dungeons; these include health items, as well as ones used for defense and offense. In addition to the items found in dungeons, the player can buy food and power-ups from wandering merchants. The player can get help from friendly non-player characters, who have various abilities: the water imp Himakichi can swim, unlike Shiren; Asuka can equip swords, shields and armor; and Riku can use his slingshot for a ranged attack.

Plot
The story of Shiren the Wanderer 2 is set before the events of the original Mystery Dungeon: Shiren the Wanderer, and follows Shiren, a ten-year-old boy who travels through the mountains with his weasel friend Koppa. They come across the village of Natane, where they stop to eat. While they are eating, a tribe of demons attacks the village; Shiren decides to build a castle to defend the village and the villagers.

Development and release

Shiren the Wanderer 2 was developed by Chunsoft over a period of nearly three years, and after the development of Shiren the Wanderer GB on Game Boy was finished. It was produced by Koichi Nakamura, directed and written by Shin-ichiro Tomie, and with planning and game balance handled by Seiichiro Nagahata. It was initially planned to be a 64DD game, but was later announced as being developed as a cartridge-based Nintendo 64 game. It was the first game in the series to use 3D graphics; according to Nakamura, they had aimed to evolve the series dramatically by introducing this 3D engine, which allowed for free roaming and open environments. They focused on creating original features, as opposed to the simultaneously developed Game Boy Color game Shiren the Wanderer GB2, for which they were forced to focus on "traditional dungeon types" due to the limitations of the Game Boy Color hardware. They considered the castle-building one of the game's main points, and developed that "core" first, before implementing dungeons. Shin-ichiro Tomie had explained there were content that were cut during the game's development, but were later recycled in Torneko: The Last Hope. A lot of trial and errors were made due to the series' transition from 2D to 3D with the Nintendo 64, although they managed to fuse both of them in the game. Moreover, the team has created the Monster Pot, a gameplay element that consists of collecting monsters in dungeons, along with a place to let the player see their collection, named Mononoke Kingdom. It would be reused in later Mystery Dungeon titles, notably in Dragon Quest: Shōnen Yangus to Fushigi no Dungeon, and the Pokémon Mystery Dungeon series, minus the use of a pot. The gameplay was planned by Kouji Maruta, one of the programmers for EarthBound, and Homeland, and it is inspired of the German board game Catan, where Shiren combines materials found in dungeons to rebuild the town.

The game was originally planned to be released in April 2000 in Japan, but was delayed and released on September 27, 2000; it has not been made available in English. In 2010, Chunsoft said that it was possible that they would re-release the game on the Wii's Virtual Console if fans of the series showed their demand, but that they had no plans for it at the time. Chunsoft considered re-releasing the game for the Nintendo DS at one point, but decided to port the original Mystery Dungeon: Shiren the Wanderer to that platform instead.

Although the game was not released officially in English, a fan translation was developed and released in September 2021, 21 years after its initial release in Japan, in the form of a patch.

Reception

In their cross-review, Famitsu scored the game a 38 out of 40, with the individual reviewers giving it 10, 9, 9 and 10; this was one of the highest scoring games of 2000, with only seven other games scoring 36 or higher in that year. During its debut week, it was the best selling game in Japan, with 147,864 copies sold. By the end of 2000, it was the 49th best selling game of the year in Japan, with a total of 238,338 copies sold; an additional 45,653 copies were sold during the following year, for a grand total of 283,991 copies sold.

Writers for IGN said that the dungeon exploration could get monotonous; they said that what they played was decent, but that they "weren't blown away", and that the gameplay, while acceptable, was plain. They enjoyed the game's graphics, saying that the characters and landscapes were detailed to a level that was "uncommon of a first-generation product", and that the 3D effects helped "beautify" the environments.

Notes

References

External links
 Official website 

2000 video games
Chunsoft games
Japan-exclusive video games
Nintendo 64 games
Nintendo 64-only games
Cancelled 64DD games
Role-playing video games
Video games about demons
Video games using procedural generation
Video games developed in Japan
Single-player video games
Mystery Dungeon
Roguelike video games
Video games scored by Koichi Sugiyama